Innovation Kvaerner  (also known as Atea) is a yacht. She finished fourth in the 1997–98 Whitbread Round the World Race skippered by Knut Frostad.

Career
Innovation Kvaerner was designed by Bruce Farr and built by Kvaerner Mandal.

References

Volvo Ocean Race yachts
Sailing yachts of Norway
Sailing yachts of Denmark
Volvo Ocean 60 yachts
1990s sailing yachts